The non-marine molluscs of Argentina are a part of the molluscan fauna of Argentina.

There are hundreds of species of molluscs living in the wild in Argentina. 

There are a total of ??? species of gastropods, which breaks down to 101 species of freshwater gastropods, and ??? species of land gastropods in ?? genera, plus 65 species of bivalves living in the wild.

There are ?? non-indigenous species of gastropods (4 freshwater and ?? land species: ?? snails and ?? slugs) and ? species of bivalves in the wild in Argentina. This is a total of ? freshwater non-indigenous species of wild molluscs.

Potamolithus is the largest genus (with highest species richness) of recent freshwater snails in Argentina.

Summary table of number of species

Freshwater gastropods 
There are 10 families of freshwater gastropods in Argentina. There are 40 species of freshwater gastropods endemic to Argentina. There are about 45 endangered freshwater gastropods in Argentina.

Ampullariidae – 12 species, one endemic
 Asolene platae (Maton, 1809)
 Asolene puelchella (Anton, 1839)
 Asolene spixii (d'Orbigny, 1835)
 Felipponea neritiniformis (Dall, 1919)
 Felipponea elongata (Dall, 1921)
 Felipponea iheringi (Pilsbry, 1933)
 Marisa planogyra Pilsbry, 1933
 Pomacea canaliculata (Lamarck, 1822)
 Pomacea insularum (d'Orbigny, 1835)
 Pomacea scalaris (d'Orbigny, 1835)
 Pomella americanista (Ihering, 1919)
 Pomella megastoma (G. B. Sowerby I, 1825)

Thiaridae – 4 species, 3 endemic but extinct in the wild
 Aylacostoma chloroticum Hylton-Scot, 1954 – extinct in the wild
 Aylacostoma guaraniticum (Hylton-Scot, 1951) – extinct in the wild
 Aylacostoma stigmaticum Hylton-Scot, 1954 – extinct in the wild
 Melanoides tuberculata (O. F. Müller, 1774)

Cochliopidae – 16 species, 10 endemic
 Heleobia australis (d'Orbigny, 1835)
 Heleobia castellanosae (Gaillard, 1974)
 Heleobia conexa (Gaillard, 1974)
 Heleobia guaranitica (Doering, 1884)
 Heleobia hatcheri (Pilsbry, 1911)
 Heleobia isabelleana (d'Orbigny, 1835)
 Heleobia kuesteri (Ströbel, 1874)
 Heleobia montana (Doering, 1884)
 Heleobia occidentalis (Doering, 1884)
 Heleobia parchappii (d'Orbigny, 1835) – but Heleobia occidentalis and Heleobia vianai may be synonyms of Heleobia parchappii
 Heleobia peiranoi (Weyrauch, 1963)
 Heleobia piscium (d'Orbigny, 1835)
 Heleobia rionegrina (Gaillard, 1974)
 Heleobia sublineata (Pilsbry, 1911)
 Heleobia tucumana (Gaillard, 1974)
 Heleobia vianai (Parodiz, 1960)

Lithoglyphidae – 22 species
 Potamolithus agapetus Pilsbry, 1911
 Potamolithus bushii (Frauenfeld, 1865)
 Potamolithus callosus Pilsbry, 1925
 Potamolithus catharinae Pilsbry, 1911
 Potamolithus concordianus Parodiz, 1966
 Potamolithus conicus (Brot, 1867)
 Potamolithus dinochilus Pilsbry, 1896
 Potamolithus doeringi Pilsbry, 1911
 Potamolithus hidalgoi Pilsbry, 1896
 Potamolithus iheringi Pilsbry, 1896
 Potamolithus lapidum (d'Orbigny, 1835)
 Potamolithus microthauma Pilsbry, 1896
 Potamolithus orbignyi Pilsbry, 1896
 Potamolithus paranensis Pilsbry, 1911
 Potamolithus peristomatus (d'Orbigny, 1835)
 Potamolithus petitianus (d'Orbigny, 1840)
 Potamolithus philipianus Pilsbry, 1911
 Potamolithus quadratus Pilsbry & Ihering, 1911
 Potamolithus rushii Pilsbry, 1896
 Potamolithus simplex Pilsbry, 1911
 Potamolithus tricostatus (Brot, 1867)
 Potamolithus valchetensis Miquel, 1998

Glacidorbidae – 1 species
 Gondwanorbis magallanicus (Meier-Brook & Smith, 1976)

Chilinidae – 17 species, 12 endemic
 Chilina aurantia Marshall, 1924
 Chilina dombeiana (Bruguière, 1789)
 Chilina fluminea (Maton, 1809)
 Chilina fulgurata Pilsbry, 1911
 Chilina gallardoi Castellanos & Gaillard, 1981
 Chilina gibbosa G. B. Sowerby I, 1841
 Chilina guaraniana Castellanos & Miquel, 1980
 Chilina iguazuensis Gregoric & Rumi, 2008
 Chilina megastoma Hylton Scott, 1958
 Chilina mendozana Ströbel, 1874
 Chilina neuquenensis Marshall, 1933
 Chilina parchappii (d'Orbigny, 1835)
 Chilina patagonica Sowerby II, 1874
 Chilina perrieri Mabille, 1833
 Chilina portillensis Hidalgo, 1880
 Chilina rushii Pilsbry, 1911
 Chilina strebeli Pilsbry, 1911

Lymnaeidae – 5 species, 2 endemic
 Pseudosuccinea columella (Say, 1817)
 Lymnaea diaphana King, 1830
 Lymnaea pictonica Rochebrune & Mabille, 1885
 Lymnaea plicata Hylton Scott, 1953
 Lymnaea viatrix (d´Orbigny, 1835)

Planorbidae – 20 species
 Antillorbis nordestensis (Lucena, 1954)
 Acrorbis petricola Odhner, 1937
 Biomphalaria intermedia (Paraense & Deslandes, 1962)
 Biomphalaria occidentalis Paraense, 1981
 Biomphalaria oligoza Paraense, 1974
 Biomphalaria orbignyi Paraense, 1975
 Biomphalaria peregrina (d´Orbigny, 1835)
 Biomphalaria straminea (Dunker, 1848)
 Biomphalaria tenagophila (d´Orbigny, 1835)
 Drepanotrema anatinum (d´Orbigny, 1835)
 Drepanotrema cimex (Moricand, 1839)
 Drepanotrema depressissimun (Moricand, 1839)
 Drepanotrema heloicum (d'Orbigny, 1835)
 Drepanotrema kermatoides (d'Orbigny, 1835)
 Drepanotrema lucidum (Pfeiffer, 1839)
 Anisancylus obliquus (Broderip & G. B. Sowerby I, 1832)
 Gundlachia ticaga (Marcus & Marcus, 1962)
 Hebetancylus moricandi (d´Orbigny, 1837)
 Laevapex sp.
 Uncancylus concentricus (d´Orbigny, 1835)

Physidae – 5 species, 2? endemic
 Physa aspii Holmerg, 1909
 Physa loosi Holmerg, 1909
 "Physella cubensis" (Pfeiffer, 1839)
 "Physella venustula" (Gould, 1848)
 "Stenophysa marmorata" (Guilding, 1828)

Land gastropods 

Cyclophoridae
 Adelopoma tucma

Charopidae
 Lilloiconcha tucumana
 Radiodiscus iheringi
 Trochogyra leptotera Rochebrune & Mabille, 1882

Helicodiscidae

Diplommatinidae

Succineidae
 Omalonyx unguis (d’Orbigny, 1837)

Scolodontidae (Systrophiidae is a synonym for Scolodontidae)
 Wayampia trochilioneides
 Scolodonta Doering, 1875

Odontostomidae
 Plagiodontes rocae Doering, 1881
 Plagiodontes weyrauchi Pizá & Cazzaniga, 2009

Milacidae
 Milax gagates (Draparnaud, 1801) – non-indigenous

Epiphragmophoridae
 Epiphragmophora Doering, 1874 – (see also Cuezzo 2006)

Freshwater bivalves

Hyriidae – 1? endemic

Etheriidae – 1? endemic

Sphaeriidae – 25 species, 10 endemic

Corbiculidae
 Corbicula fluminea – invasive species

Mytilidae
 Limnoperna fortunei – invasive species

See also
 List of marine molluscs of Argentina

Lists of molluscs of surrounding countries:
 List of non-marine molluscs of Chile
 List of non-marine molluscs of Bolivia
 List of non-marine molluscs of Paraguay
 List of non-marine molluscs of Brazil
 List of non-marine molluscs of Uruguay

References

Further reading
 Cuezzo M. G. (2006). "Systematic Revision and Cladistic Analysis of Epiphragmophora Doering from Argentina and Southern Bolivia (Gastropoda: Stylommatophora: Xanthonychidae)". Malacologia 49(1): 121–188. 
 Fernández D. (1973). "Catálogo de la malacofauna terrestre argentina". Comisión de Investigaciones Científicas de la Provincia de Buenos Aires 4: 1–197.
 Fernández D. & Castellanos Z. (1973). "Clave genérica de la malacofauna terrestre Argentina". Revista del Museo de La Plata XI, Zoología 107: 265–285.
 Gregoric D. E. G., Núñez V., Rumi A. & Roche M. A. (2006). "Freshwater gastropods from del Plata basin, Argentina. Checklist and new locality records". Comunicaciones de la Sociedad Malacológica del Uruguay 9(89): 51–60. PDF.
  Holmberg E. L. (1909). "Mollusca Geophila Argentina Nova". Apuntes Historia Natural Buenos Aires 1: 19–12.
  Holmberg E. L. (1909). "Mollusca Argentina Varia". Apuntes Historia Natural Buenos Aires 1: 691–92.
  Holmberg E. L. (1912). "Moluscos Argentinos en parte nuevos, coleccionados por Franco Pastore". Physis 1: 20–22.
  Miquel S. E. & Aguirre M. L. (2011). "Taxonomía de los gastrópodos terrestres del Cuartenario de Argentina". [Taxonomy of terrestrial gastropods from the Quaternary of Argentina.] Revista Española de Paleontología 26(2): 101–133. PDF.
  Parodiz J. J. (1957). "Catalogue of Land Mollusca of Argentina". The Nautilus 70(4): 127-135.
  Parodiz J. J. (1957). "Catalogue of Land Mollusca of Argentina". The Nautilus 71(1): 22-30.

Nonmarine molluscs
Molloscs
Argentina
Argentina
Argentina
Argentina